Stig Carlsson can refer to:

 Stig Carlsson (footballer), a Swedish footballer
 Stig Carlsson (ice hockey), a Swedish ice hockey player